Nexter Systems (formerly known as GIAT Industries or Groupement des Industries de l'Armée de Terre, Army Industries Group) is a French government-owned weapons manufacturer, based in Roanne, Loire.

Group organization

The Nexter group is divided in several smaller entities, with the main one being Nexter Systems. The sub-companies are:
 Nexter Munitions
 Nexter Mechanics
 Nexter Electronics
 Nexter Robotics
 Nexter Training
 OptSys
 NBC Sys
 Euro-Shelter
 Mecar
 Simmel Difesa

History
The GIAT group was founded in 1973 by combining the industrial assets of the technical direction of Army weapons of the French Ministry of Defense.  The company was nationalized in 1991.  On 22 September 2006 GIAT became the core of the new company Nexter.

For many years GIAT struggled to turn a profit.  The company was operated at a loss. A 2001 report by the Cour des Comptes and a 2002 report by the National Assembly described the situation as critical.  In April 2004 the board of directors presented the public with a financial statement showing a profit of several hundred million Euros.  This was mainly due to increased export sales, and the modernization of the Leclerc Main Battle Tank (MBT) and several other armored platforms. Sales to the UAE however were accomplished with the payment of $200 million to intermediaries.

In 2006, the THL-20 gun turret was selected by Hindustan Aeronautics Limited for use on the HAL Light Combat Helicopter, incorporating the 20 mm M621 cannon.

Nexter has a joint venture CTA International with BAE Systems to develop and manufacture case telescoped weapon systems and ammunition of 40 mm calibre.

Nexter continues to produce several former GIAT small arms, cannon, and anti-armour weapons.  One such weapon is the Wasp 58, a low cost, one man antiarmour/assault weapon system.

Merger with KMW 
In 2015, Nexter and Krauss-Maffei merged under a single structure.  The new KMW+Nexter Defense Systems (KNDS) will be the European leader of terrestrial defense with more than 6,000 employees. The supervisory board appointed the new CEO of Nexter Systems, Stéphane Mayer, and the chairman of the executive board of KMW, Frank Haun, as CEOs of the holding company.

Products
Nexter design and manufactures Military protected vehicles for the French military and other international militaries:
 The Véhicule de l'Avant Blindé (VAB) armoured personnel carrier;
 The Nexter Aravis - Mine Resistant Ambush Protected Vehicle;
 The Nexter Titus wheeled and mine protected vehicle;
 The VBMR Griffon armoured personal carrier VMBR-L Serval and EBRC Jaguar
The company also acquired a large influence in the field of combat and artillery vehicles thanks to the development of several large caliber canons:
 The Leclerc main battle tank;
 The CAESAR - 155 mm wheeled self-propelled howitzer;
 The VBCI (Véhicule blindé de combat d'infanterie) wheeled armoured infantry fighting vehicle;
 The LG1 Mark II 105 mm towed howitzer;
 The TRF1 155 mm towed howitzer
 The GCT 155mm self-propelled gun
 The AMX-10 RC tank destroyer
And several types of munitions for medium and large-calibre weapons:
 120 mm ammunitions
 155 mm ammunitions
 Tank ammunitions
 40 mm ammunitions

Nexter/Giat also manufactures various weapons:
 The FAMAS assault rifle;
 The M621 cannon
 The FR F2 sniper rifle;
 The 20 mm modèle F2 gun;
 The M811 25 mm cannon;  
 The APILAS anti-tank rocket launcher;
 The Wasp 58 Light Anti-Armour Weapon;
 The Armes de Défense Rapprochée personal defence weapon;
 The GIAT 30 aircraft-mounted revolver cannon;

References

  Cour des Comptes, Les industries d'armement de l'État, chapter 3, 2001

External links

 

 
Defence companies of France
Ammunition manufacturers
Firearm manufacturers of France
Military vehicle manufacturers
Companies based in Paris-Saclay
Manufacturing companies established in 1973
Technology companies established in 1973
Companies based in Auvergne-Rhône-Alpes